John Allan Sutor (1 July 1909 – 2 December 1966) was an English first-class cricketer who played in a single match for Worcestershire against Hampshire in the last round of matches in the 1928 County Championship. He did not distinguish himself, being dismissed for 2 and 1, and he never played again.

Sutor was born in Knighton-upon-Teme, Worcestershire; he died aged 57 in Sydney, Australia.

External links
 

1909 births
1966 deaths
English cricketers
Worcestershire cricketers